This is a list of diseases starting with the letter "N".

N–Nas
 N acetyltransferase deficiency
 N syndrome
 N-Acetylglutamate synthase deficiency
 N-acetyl-alpha-D-galactosaminidase
 N-acetyl-glucosamine-6-sulfate sulfatase deficiency
 NADH CoQ reductase, deficiency of
 NADH cytochrome B5 reductase deficiency
 Naegeli–Franceschetti–Jadassohn syndrome
 Naguib syndrome
 Nail–patella syndrome
 Nakajo–Nishimura syndrome
 Nakajo syndrome
 Nakamura–Osame syndrome
 NAME syndrome
 Nance–Horan syndrome
 Nanism due to growth hormone combined deficiency
 Nanism due to growth hormone isolated deficiency with X-linked hypogammaglobulinemia
 Nanism due to growth hormone resistance
 Narcissistic personality disorder
 Narcolepsy
 Narcolepsy-Cataplexy
 Narrow oral fissure short stature cone shaped epiphyses
 Nasodigitoacoustic syndrome
 Nasopalpebral lipoma coloboma syndrome
 Nasopharyngeal carcinoma
 Nasopharyngeal teratoma Dandy–Walker diaphragmatic hernia
 Nasopharyngitis

Nat–Nav
 Natal teeth intestinal pseudoobstruction patent ductus
 Nathalie syndrome
 Native American myopathy
 Navajo poikiloderma
 Naxos disease

Ne

Nec–Neo
 Necrotizing encephalopathy, infantile subacute
 Necrotizing fasciitis
 Negative rheumatoid factor polyarthritis
 Neisseria meningitidis
 Nelson syndrome
 Nemaline myopathy
 Nemaline myopathy, type 1
 Nemaline myopathy, type 2
 Nemaline myopathy, type 3
 Nemaline myopathy, type 4
 Nemaline myopathy, type 5
 Neonatal diabetes mellitus
 Neonatal diabetes mellitus, permanent (PNDM)
 Neonatal diabetes mellitus, transient (TNDM)
 Neonatal hemochromatosis
 Neonatal hepatitis
 Neonatal infection
 Neonatal herpes
 Neonatal ovarian cyst
 Neonatal transient jaundice
 Necrophilia
 Necromancy

Nep–Net
 Nephroblastomatosis, fetal ascites, macrosomia and Wilms' tumor
 Nephrocalcinosis
 Nephrogenic diabetes insipidus
 Nephrolithiasis type 2
 Nephronophthisis familial adult spastic q­riparesis
 Nephropathy deafness hyperparathyroidism
 Nephropathy familial with hyperuricemia
 Nephropathy, familial with gout
 Nephrosclerosis
 Nephrosis deafness urinary tract digital malformation
 Nephrosis neuronal dysmigration syndrome
 Nephrotic syndrome
 Nephrotic syndrome ocular anomalies
 Nephrotic syndrome, idiopathic, steroid-resistant
 Nerve sheath neoplasm
 Nesidioblastosis of pancreas
 Netherton syndrome ichthyosis

Neu
 Neu Laxova syndrome

Neuh
 Neuhauser–Daly–Magnelli syndrome
 Neuhauser–Eichner–Opitz syndrome

Neur

Neura–Neuri
 Neural crest tumor
 Neural tube defect, folate-sensitive
 Neural tube defects X linked
 Neuraminidase beta-galactosidase deficiency
 Neuraminidase deficiency
 Neurasthenia
 Neurilemmomatosis
 Neuritis with brachial predilection

Neuro

Neuroa–Neurog
 Neuroacanthocytosis
 Neuroaxonal dystrophy renal tubular acidosis
 Neuroaxonal dystrophy, late infantile
 Neuroblastoma
 Neurocutaneous melanosis
 Neurocysticercosis
 Neuroectodermal endocrine syndrome
 Neuroectodermal tumors primitive
 Neuroendocrine cancer
 Neuroendocrine carcinoma of the cervix
 Neuroendocrine tumor
 Neuroepithelioma
 Neurofaciodigitorenal syndrome
 Neurofibrillary tangles
 Neurofibroma
 Neurofibromatosis
 Neurofibromatosis type 2
 Neurofibromatosis type 3
 Neurofibromatosis type 6
 Neurofibromatosis, familial intestinal
 Neurofibromatosis, Type IV, of Riccardi
 Neurofibromatosis-Noonan syndrome
 Neurofibrosarcoma
 Neurogenic hypertension

Neurol–Neurot
 Neuroleptic malignant syndrome
 Neuroma biliary tract
 Neuronal ceroid lipofuscinosis
 Neuronal heterotopia
 Neuronal interstitial dysplasia
 Neuronal intestinal pseudoobstruction
 Neuronal intranuclear hyaline inclusion disease
 Neuronal intranuclear inclusion disease
 Neuropathy ataxia and retinis pigmentosa
 Neuropathy congenital sensory neurotrophic keratitis
 Neuropathy hereditary with liability to pressure palsies
 Neuropathy motor sensory type 2 deafness mental retardation
 Neuropathy sensory spastic paraplegia
 Neuropathy, hereditary motor and sensory, LOM type
 Neuropathy, hereditary sensory, type I
 Neuropathy, hereditary sensory, type II
 Neurosyphilis
 Neurotoxicity syndromes

Neut
 Neutral lipid storage myopathy
 Neutropenia intermittent
 Neutropenia monocytopenia deafness
 Neutropenia, severe chronic

Nev–Nez
 Nevi flammei, familial multiple
 Nevo syndrome
 Nevoid basal cell carcinoma syndrome
 Nevus of ota retinitis pigmentosa
 Nevus sebaceus of Jadassohn
 Nezelof syndrome

Ni–Nm
 Nicolaides–Baraitser syndrome
 Nicotine withdrawal
 Niemann–Pick disease
 Niemann–Pick C1 disease
 Niemann–Pick C2 disease
 Niemann–Pick disease, type C
 Niemann-Pick disease type D
 Night blindness
 Night blindness skeletal anomalies unusual facies
 Night blindness, congenital stationary
 Nijmegen breakage syndrome
 Nivelon–Nivelon–Mabille syndrome
 NMDA receptor antagonist neurotoxicity (NAN)

No

Nob–Nor
 Noble–Bass–Sherman syndrome
 Nocardiosis
 Noise-induced hearing loss
 Noma
 Non-24-hour sleep–wake disorder
 Non functioning pancreatic endocrine tumor
 Nonallergic atopic dermatitis
 Non-Hodgkin lymphoma
 Noninsulin-dependent diabetes mellitus with deafness
 Nonketotic hyperglycinemia
 Non-lissencephalic cortical dysplasia
 Nonmedullary thyroid carcinoma, with cell oxyphilia
 Nonne–Milroy disease
 Non-small cell lung cancer
 Nonsyndromic hereditary hearing impairment
 Nonvenereal endemic syphilis
 Nonverbal learning disorder
 Noonan like syndrome
 Noonan syndrome
 Norman–Roberts lissencephaly syndrome
 Normokalemic periodic paralysis
 Norrie disease
 Northern epilepsy syndrome
 Norum disease

Nos–Nov
 Nose polyposis, familial
 Notalgia paresthetica
 Nova syndrome
 Novak syndrome

Nu–Ny
 Nuchal bleb, familial
 Nut allergy
 Nyctophobia
 Nystagmus
 Nystagmus, central
 Nystagmus, peripheral
 Nystagmus with congenital zonular cataract

N